Joseph Adélard Descarries, KC (November 7, 1853 – July 25, 1927) was a French Canadian lawyer and politician.

Born in Saint-Timothée, Canada East, and educated at McGill University and Université Laval. He studied law with Alexandre Lacoste, was called to the Quebec Bar in 1879 and was created a Queen's Counsel in 1903.

From 1897 to 1906, he was mayor of Lachine, Quebec. In 1882, 1883, and 1884, he ran unsuccessfully for the Legislative Assembly of Quebec. He was elected as a Conservative candidate in 1892 in the riding of Jacques-Cartier. He resigned in 1895 and was defeated in 1895 by-election in the federal riding of Jacques Cartier. He was elected in a 1915 by-election as the Conservative candidate and did not run for reelection in 1917. He ran unsuccessfully as an Independent candidate in the 1921 federal election.

In 1881, he married Célina-Elmire Le Pailleur. Descarries died in Lachine at the age of 73.

He was the father of the composer Auguste Descarries.

By-election: On Mr. Monk's resignation, 2 March 1914

References
 
 

1853 births
1927 deaths
Conservative Party of Canada (1867–1942) MPs
Mayors of places in Quebec
Members of the House of Commons of Canada from Quebec
Conservative Party of Quebec MNAs
Lawyers in Quebec
People from Montérégie
People from Lachine, Quebec
Canadian King's Counsel
McGill University alumni